Maider Castillo Muga (born 3 August 1976) is a Spanish former football defender, who most recently played for Levante UD of the Primera División. She also played briefly in Japan's L. League for Takarazuka Bunny.

She was a long-standing member of the Spain women's national football team, and played at the 1997 European Championship. She retired from football in 2015.

Official international goals
 2005 Euro qualification
 1 in Spain 9-1 Belgium

References

External links

1976 births
Living people
Spanish women's footballers
Spain women's international footballers
Footballers from Eibar
Spanish expatriate footballers
Primera División (women) players
Levante UD Femenino players
SD Eibar Femenino players
Expatriate women's footballers in Japan
Nadeshiko League players
Bunnys Kyoto SC players
Spanish expatriate sportspeople in Japan
Women's association football defenders
AD Torrejón CF Femenino players